The Willapa Harbor Herald is a newspaper, founded in 1890, that provides news coverage for the towns of Raymond and South Bend, Washington.

The current owner is Flannery Publications. The publisher is Community Media Corp.

It was founded in 1890 and has circulated under several names.

References 

Newspapers published in Washington (state)
Pacific County, Washington